The Goldfields region of Western Australia has an extensive array of active and historical mining operations and towns. 

Some of the towns listed here were developed and abandoned within a short space of time in the late nineteenth century and early twentieth century. Some mines and towns have been revived with the fate of the nickel and gold mining operations in the region. Other minerals have also seen mines and towns develop.

A number of the towns' names are also names of Goldfields and Goldfield districts in the mineral fields of Western Australia.

Considerable information about the locations has been compiled for the Golden Quest Discovery Trail. and the West Australian Gold Towns and Settlements volumes published by Hesperian Press, which includes localities in other regions.

Towns

 Abbotts

  Agnew
 Austin
 Balagundi
 Balgarri
 Bardoc
 Beria

 Big Bell

 Black Flag
 Bonnie Vale
 Boogardie

 Boorabbin

 Boorara

 Boulder
 Broad Arrow
 Buldania

 Bullfinch
 Bulong
 Burbanks
 Burtville
 Callion
 Canegrass

 Colreavy (Knutsford)
 Comet Vale

 Coolgardie (The Old Camp)
 Cossack

 Cuddingwarra

 Cue

 Darlot (Woodarra)
 Davyhurst
 Day Dawn

 Desmond
 Duketon
 Dundas
 Dunnsville

 Erlistoun
 Eulaminna
 Euro
 Feysville
 Gabanintha
 Gindalbie
 Golden Ridge
 Goongarrie also known as 90 Mile and Roaring Gimlet

 Gordon
 Grants Patch

 Gullewa
 Gwalia

 Higginsville

 Horseshoe

 Jackson

 Kambalda
 Kanowna
 Kathleen

 Kintore
 Kookynie
 Kunanalling

 Kundana

 Kundip

 Kurnalpi

 Karrajong
 Kurrawang
 Lakeside (Lakewood)

 Larkinville

 Laverton
 Lawlers

 Lennonville

 Leonora

 Linden

 Mainland
 Malcolm

 Mallina

 Marvel Loch

 Menzies
 Mertondale
 Mount Ida
 Mount Morgans

 Mulgarrie
 Mulline
 Mulwarrie

 Murrin Muirrin

 Niagara

 Noongal

 Norseman
 Ora Banda
 Paddington
 Peak Hill
 Siberia (also known as Waverley)
 Sir Samuel
 Smithfield
 Tampa
 Ularring

 Windanya
 Yarri
 Yerilla

 Yundamindera
 Yunndaga

Notes

References
 King, Norma (1974) Ghost towns of the north country Kalgoorlie/Boulder David Paton Printing
 McGowan, Barry. (2002) Australian ghost towns South Melbourne, [Vic.] : Lothian Books,

External links
 Golden Quest Trail website

Australian gold rushes
Lists of towns in Australia
Western Australia-related lists